D'Angelo (also spelt DiAngelo or Di Angelo) is an Italian surname. Notable people with the surname include:

Adam D'Angelo (b. 1984), American internet entrepreneur
Andrew D'Angelo (b. 1965), American jazz musician
Angelo D'Angelo (b. 1985), Italian footballer 
Beverly D'Angelo (b. 1951), American actress
Carlo D'Angelo (1919–1973), Italian actor
Charlene (singer), full name Charlene Marilynn D'Angelo (b. 1950), American singer
Charles D'Angelo (b. 1985), American personal development coach
Chico d'Ângelo (b. 1953), Brazilian politician
Ernesto Pérez d'Angelo (1932–2013), Chilean paleontologist
Eduardo D'Angelo (1939–2015), Uruguayan actor
Francesco d'Angelo (1446–1488), Italian sculptor
Frank D'Angelo (b. 1959), Canadian beverage industry entrepreneur
Gianna D'Angelo (1929–2013), American soprano
Gianfranco D'Angelo (b. 1936), Italian actor
Giuseppe D'Angelo, various people
Ivan D'Angelo (b. 1990/1991), Italian footballer
Jacopo d'Angelo (1360–1411), Italian humanist
José D'Angelo (b. 1989), Argentinian footballer
Josephine D'Angelo (1924–2013), American baseball player
Luca D'Angelo (b. 1971), Italian football manager
Louis D'Angelo (1888–1958), American bass-baritone
Mario d'Angelo (b. 1954), French academic
Matt Di Angelo (b. 1987), British actor 
Mike D'Angelo (b. 1968), American film critic
Mirella D'Angelo (b. 1956), Italian actress
Nino D'Angelo (b. 1957), Italian singer
Sabrina D'Angelo (b. 1993), Canadian soccer player
Salvo D'Angelo (1909–1989), Italian film producer
Santo D'Angelo (b. 1995), Italian footballer
Sebastián D'Angelo (b. 1989), Argentinian footballer 
Sharlee D'Angelo (b. 1973), bassist of Swedish melodic death metal band Arch Enemy
Roberto D'Angelo (b. 1945), Italian canoeist
Robin DiAngelo (b. 1956), American author
Victoria Scott D'Angelo, second wife of Chuck Yeager
Vincenzo D'Angelo (1951–2008), Italian water-polo player

Italian-language surnames